The Cabinet of the state of Andhra Pradesh, India, forms the executives branch of the government of Andhra Pradesh. Along with the chief minister, there are 5 deputy chief ministers and 20 Cabinet Ministers.

Council of Ministers

Former Ministers

Cabinet reshuffle

22 July 2020

 Chelluboina Venu Gopala Krishna – Taken Oath As New Minister And Assigned With Backward classes welfare.
 Dr. Seediri Appalaraju – Taken Oath As New Minister And Assigned With  Animal Husbandry, Fisheries And Dairy Development.
 Dharmana Krishna Das – He Became Deputy Chief Minister And Minister for Revenue, Stamps and Registration Portfolios. Before He Was Minister for Roads And Buildings.
 Malagundla Sankaranarayana – He Became Minister for Roads And Buildings. Before He Was Minister for Backward classes welfare.

References

Lists of current Indian state and territorial ministries
Andhra Pradesh ministries
YSR Congress Party
2019 establishments in Andhra Pradesh
Cabinets established in 2019